D. rosacea  may refer to:
 Drillia rosacea, a sea snail species
 Ducula rosacea, the pink-headed imperial-pigeon, a bird species found in Indonesia and East Timor

See also
 Rosacea (disambiguation)